Urophora cuspidata is a species of tephritid or fruit flies in the genus Urophora of the family Tephritidae.

Distribution
North & Central Europe, West Siberia & Caucasus.

References

Urophora
Insects described in 1826
Diptera of Europe